Callawa Station is a pastoral lease that was once a sheep station but now operates as a cattle station in Western Australia. 

The property lies between Yarrie Station and Shay Gap. The station is the western terminus of the Gary Junction Road that runs west  from Liebig Hill. The property shares a boundary with Devahl Station.

The station was established at some time prior to 1909.

The Darlington family were owners of the property for a long period of time, from at least 1923 until 1952.

The  station is currently one of the Strelley properties, five pastoral leases held by Indigenous Australian groups including the Strelley Pastoral Company. Other properties in the group are Carlindi Station, Strelley and Lalla Rookh Station.

See also
List of ranches and stations
List of pastoral leases in Western Australia

References

Pastoral leases in Western Australia
Stations (Australian agriculture)
Homesteads in Western Australia
Pilbara